Earl Bowman Marlatt (May 24, 1892 Columbus, Indiana –  June 13, 1976 Winchester, Indiana) was an American theologian and poet.

Life
He graduated from DePauw University. He served in World War I and graduated from Boston University School of Theology. In 1923, he began teaching in the Boston University.  From 1945 to 1957, he taught at Southern Methodist University's Perkins School of Theology.

He wrote many hymns, one of the best known being Are Ye Able. He also collected church hymns, with the intent to establish a museum. He was a friend of Katherine Lee Bates. His work appeared in Poetry Magazine,

Many of his papers are held at DePauw University.  A signed manuscript of his hymn Are Ye Able actually written Feb. 23, 1926, is included in the Bridwell Library Manuscript and Documents Collection.

He died at his home in Winchester, Indiana on June 13, 1976.

Awards
 1970/71 Poet Laureate of Indiana
 Golden Rose Award

Works

Poetry

Editor

Theology

Autobiography

References

1892 births
1976 deaths
People from Columbus, Indiana
American male poets
DePauw University alumni
Boston University School of Theology alumni
Boston University faculty
Southern Methodist University faculty
People from Winchester, Indiana
20th-century American poets
20th-century American male writers